The Anthony Shadid Award for Journalism Ethics is a journalism award presented annually by the Center for Journalism Ethics at the University of Wisconsin–Madison. It was originally named Wisconsin Commitment to Journalism Ethics Award in 2010, and was renamed after journalist and alumnus Anthony Shadid who died in 2012. According to the Center website, "the Shadid Award recognizes ethical decisions in reporting stories in any medium, including print, broadcast and digital, by journalists working for established news organizations or publishing individually."

Background
Anthony Shadid was a foreign correspondent for The New York Times based in Baghdad and Beirut who won the Pulitzer Prize for International Reporting twice, in 2004 and 2010. Shadid, a graduate of UW-Madison, died in 2012 while crossing the Syrian border on a reporting assignment for The New York Times. Shadid sat on the Center for Journalism Ethics advisory board and strongly supported its efforts to promote public interest journalism and to stimulate discussion about journalism ethics. In December 2010, Shadid gave the inaugural CJE ethics lecture. His powerful speech, "The Truths We Tell: Reporting on Faith, War and the Fate of Iraq," conveys Shadid's commitment to the highest ideals of journalism.

In 2010-2013, the recipients were limited to those in the Wisconsin area. Starting with 2014, the nominations were accepted from journalists around the world.

Format
The Shadid Award is different from other journalism prizes in that it seeks to recognize the difficult, behind-the-scenes decisions reporters make in pursuing high-impact stories and in fulfilling their ethical obligations to sources, to people caught up in news events, and to the public at large.

This national recognition focuses on current journalism and does not include books, documentaries and other long-term projects. Individuals or news organizations may nominate themselves or others.

Winners receive a $1,000 prize and travel expenses to accept the award at a ceremony in either New York City or Washington, DC. At the award ceremony, reporters discuss their reporting and how they produced the winning story.

List of winners

References

External links 
 

American journalism awards
2010 establishments in Wisconsin
Awards established in 2010